A table showing the results of general elections for the Governor of Delaware, beginning in 1792 when the Delaware Constitution of 1792 went into effect, providing for the popular election of Governors.

The Governor serves as head of the executive branch of the state's government. Beginning in 1792, the Governor was popularly elected, at first for a three-year term, changing to a four-year term in 1831. Elections were held the first Tuesday in October until 1831, when they were changed to the first Tuesday after November 1.

Governors of Delaware

Notes

References
 
 
 
 

 
Quadrennial elections